Anthia massilicata is a species of ground beetle in the subfamily Anthiinae. It was described by Félix Édouard Guérin-Méneville in 1845.

References

Anthiinae (beetle)
Beetles described in 1845